A gubernatorial election was held on 17 November 2002 to elect the Governor of ,  who is the southernmost and westernmost prefecture of Japan.

Candidates 

Keiichi Inamine, 69, incumbent (elected in 1998), backed by LDP, NK and NCP.
Masanori Yoshimoto, 65, former vice governor of Okinawa prefecture, endorsed by DPJ, SDP, OSMP, LP.
Shigenobu Araki, 60, president of Okinawa Prefecture Medical Co-op, chairman of the local chapter of JCP.
Mitsuo Matayoshi, 54, a conservative Protestant preacher. He led his own party, know as World Economic Community Party.

Results 

This is the first time that the JCP has presented a candidate of its own, outside the opposition alliance.

References 

Content in this edit is translated from the existing Japanese Wikipedia article at :ja:2002年沖縄県知事選挙; see its history for attribution.

2002 elections in Japan
Okinawa gubernatorial elections